Nestor Alexandrovich Kalandarishvili (June 26 [July 8] 1876, Kutaisi province - March 6, 1922, Yakutsk) was a revolutionary leader, by turns a Socialist Revolutionary, anarchist and finally a Bolshevik. He was one of the leaders of the partisan movement in Eastern Siberia during the Russian Civil War.

Biography
Until 1892 he studied at the Kutaisi gymnasium, then at the Tiflis teacher's seminary. From 1895 to 1897 he served in the Russian Imperial Army. After the army he continued his studies at the seminary.

From 1903 he was a member of the Socialist Revolutionary Party, for some time - in the Georgian Socialist-Federalist Revolutionary Party. He participated in the 1905 Russian Revolution, including the Gurian peasant uprising of 1905-1906. In 1907 he was arrested, in 1908 he was sent into exile in Siberia. He fled but in 1912 he was arrested and again exiled to Siberia. He was released during the February Revolution and became an anarcho-communist, establishing a squadron of anarchists in Irkutsk. In December 1917, he participated in the establishment of Soviet power and the suppression of the cadet uprising in Irkutsk.

From February to July 1918, he commanded troops of the Centrosibir. At the beginning of October 1918, it was defeated at Kyakhta. With a detachment of 800 people with 12 machine guns, he crossed the Mongolian border to Khatvyl (a Mongolian settlement 300 miles from the border).

In March 1919, the Irkutsk Committee of the Russian Communist Party (Bolshevik) established contact with Kalandarishvili and offered him their cooperation. At first, he refused, but the committee offered to provide the detachment with funds, weapons and people. Kalandarishvili agreed with the proposed terms. The detachment was offered an action plan for the section of the railway from Lake Baikal to the Zima station.

In the spring and summer of 1919, Kalandarishvili's detachment was based 70 versts west of Irkutsk and operated in the Kitoy River basin. In the summer of 1919, the detachment derailed 8 trains and destroyed the railway bridge over the Kitoy River. Kolchakites posted a bounty of 40 thousand rubles for Kalandarishvili's head.

In September 1919, the detachment moved north from Irkutsk, to the right bank of the Angara. The partisans freed some of the prisoners from the Aleksandrovsky penal servitude center. From December 1919 to February 1920, he commanded detachments of the Verkholensk partisan front. In early January 1920, he took part in the establishment of Soviet power in Irkutsk. In March–April 1920, he commanded the Verkholensk group of Soviet troops and from May 1920 he commanded cavalry units in the People's Revolutionary Army of the Far Eastern Republic.

In August 1920, he was the representative of the Foreign Ministry of the Far Eastern Republic at the Chinese military mission in Moscow. From December 1920 he was the commander of the troops of the Yakutsk region and the Northern Territory. In March 1921, the Korean Revolutionary Military Council was created, headed by Kalandarishvili. However, Kalandarishvili did not then command all the Korean partisans. In March 1921, in the Far Eastern Republic, a congress of partisans elected the Korean War Council. Subordinate to the Korean Military Council, the United Sakhalin Partisan Detachment, led by Ilya Kharitonovich Pak, refused to obey the Korean Revolutionary Military Council. The People's Revolutionary Army tried to disarm the partisans and as a result of the Amur incident on June 28, 1921, between 118 to 400 partisans died (many drowned in Zeya).

In 1921 he joined the Russian Communist Party (Bolsheviks). In January 1922, with a detachment of 300 people, he went to eliminate the detachments of the Yakut rebels, but was ambushed on the Khakhsyt channel and was killed 33 km from Yakutsk.

He was buried on April 2, 1922 in Yakutsk. On September 17, 1922, he was reburied in Irkutsk at the Jerusalem cemetery. The grave of Nestor Kalandarishvili is a historical monument of local importance.

There is a hypothesis that the ambush on Kalandarishvili's headquarters was organized by pro-Yakut-minded local Bolsheviks.

Depictions in media 
The Kalandarishvili detachment is described in the story "The Heir of Genghis Khan" by Ivan Novokshonov (1896-1943), as well as in the novel "At the Edge of the Ocean" by Andrei Aldan-Semyonov (1908-1985).
In 1928, based on the story of Ivan Novokshonov, the director Vsevolod Pudovkin shot the feature film "Storm over Asia".
In 1932 the artist Vasily Semyonovich Svarog created the painting “The death of comrade Kalandarishvili in Yakutia”.
In 1973, the Georgian Film Studio shot the feature film "Siberian Grandfather".

References

Bibliography 
 Атлас офицера. — М.: Изд-во Генштаба Вооруженных Сил СССР, 1947. — С. 176.
 Шли дивизии вперед (1919—1921): НРА в освобождении Забайкалья: Сборник документов. — Иркутск, 1987. — Т. 3.
 Василевский В. И. Революция и Гражданская война в Забайкалье: Краткий биографический указатель. — Чита, 1989.
 Выдающийся руководитель сибирских партизан. // Военно-исторический журнал. — 1962. — № 3. — С.126—127.
 Солодянкин А. Г. Коммунисты Иркутска в борьбе с колчаковщиной. — Иркутск, 1960.
 Полонский И. В. Безначальцы и чернознаменцы. Анархисты начала XX века против Российской империи. — 2017. — 

1876 births
1922 deaths
Recipients of the Order of the Red Banner
Anarchists from the Russian Empire
Anarchists from Georgia (country)
Soviet military personnel of the Russian Civil War
Socialist Revolutionary Party politicians
Anarcho-communists
Bolsheviks
Murdered anarchists
Death conspiracy theories